An audion receiver makes use of a single vacuum tube or transistor to detect and amplify signals.  It is so called because it originally used the audion tube as the active element. Unlike a crystal detector or Fleming valve detector, the audion provided amplification of the signal as well as detection. The audion was invented by Lee De Forest.

In its operation, the circuit demodulates the radio frequency (RF) signal by rectification or square-law detection, and then amplifies this demodulated signal. The capacitor in series with the grid and parallel resistance forms a grid-leak detector which allow the grid to cathode to be used as a diode. 

In 1915 Edwin Armstrong developed an improved "regenerative" form of audion receiver that used the same vacuum tube for RF amplification, RF detection, and audio amplification.

See also
 Tuned radio frequency receiver

References

Types of radios